Vesicular integral-membrane protein VIP36 is a protein that in humans is encoded by the LMAN2 gene.

References

Further reading